S. Bear Bergman (born September 22, 1974) is an American author, poet, playwright, and theater artist. He is a trans man, and his gender identity is a main focus of his artwork.

Biography
Bergman was educated at Concord Academy, was one of the founders of the first Gay–straight alliance and a member of the Governor of Massachusetts' Safe Schools Commission for LGBT youth. He received a Bachelor of Fine Arts degree from Hampshire College in 1996.

Bergman's first book, Butch Is A Noun, was released in September 2006 by Suspect Thoughts Press and was nominated for a Lambda Literary Award in the LGBT Nonfiction category. A new edition was published by Arsenal Pulp Press in 2010. Bergman's second book, The Nearest Exit May Be Behind You, was released by Arsenal Pulp Press in the fall of 2009 and was a Lambda Literary Award finalist in the Transgender category. He co-edited with genderqueer author Kate Bornstein Gender Outlaws: The Next Generation, which won a 2011 Lambda Literary Award in the LGBT Anthology category and a special Judges Award from the Publishing Triangle. He is also the author of four books for children (one of which, The Adventures of Tulip, Birthday Wish Fairy, was a 2013 Lambda Literary Award finalist in the LGBT Children's/Young Adult category) and has a sixth book titled Blood, Marriage, Wine & Glitter published September 23, 2013 from Arsenal Pulp Press.

In addition, Bergman continues to lecture and perform at universities, festivals and theatres throughout the United States, Canada, and the United Kingdom. His performances have received judges' awards at each of the last three biennial National Gay & Lesbian Theatre Festival in Columbus, Ohio, including Best of the Festival and Best New Work. In 2005, Bergman was awarded a Massachusetts Cultural Council grant for playwriting, as well as a Millay Colony for the Arts Fellowship award. He has also been given an assortment of honors for service to the transgender community, including The Spirit of Stonewall Award, the Trans 100 has been selected to the Toronto Arts Council Leaders Lab for his work in equity in the arts, and similar.

Bergman is the founder and publisher of Flamingo Rampant, a micropress focused on making celebratory, inclusive picture books for LGBT2Q+ children and families. He also writes the popular advice column Asking Bear, which ran on the Bitch media platform from 2015-2017 and is now an independent column.

Bergman lives in Toronto, Ontario, and is married to educator J Wallace Skelton though Bergman has openly discussed his polyamorous orientation in his essays. They have three children.

In 2015, Bergman wrote, as a Contributor for the Huffington Post, an article entitled "I Have Come to Indoctrinate Your Children Into My LGBTQ Agenda (And I'm Not a Bit Sorry)."

Books
 Blood, Marriage, Wine & Glitter 2013, Arsenal Pulp Press, 
 The Adventures of Tulip, Birthday Wish Fairy 2012, Flamingo Rampant, 
 Backwards Day 2012, Flamingo Rampant, 
 Gender Outlaws: The Next Generation co-edited with Kate Bornstein. 2010, Seal Press 
 The Nearest Exit May Be Behind You 2009, Arsenal Pulp Press, 
 Butch Is A Noun 2006, reissued 2010, Arsenal Pulp Press,

Theater & performance
 Gender Reveal Party
Machatunim
 The Virginity Lost & Found
 Monday Night in Westerbork
 Clearly Marked
 You'll Never Piss In This Town Again
 Ex Post Papa

References

External links
 sbearbergman.com

American short story writers
American essayists
American performance artists
Transgender artists
Canadian transgender writers
Transgender men
Jewish American writers
American transgender writers
Hampshire College alumni
1974 births
Living people
Lambda Literary Award winners
Canadian LGBT poets
Transgender Jews
Concord Academy alumni
21st-century American poets
21st-century American Jews
Transgender poets
Transgender dramatists and playwrights
American LGBT poets